The Republic of the North Solomons was an unrecognised state that purported to exist for about six months in what is now the Autonomous Region of Bougainville, Papua New Guinea (PNG). It involved:

Independence was unilaterally declared on 1 September 1975, from the Australian-administered territory of Papua and New Guinea, which itself was due to become independent on 16 September.

Tensions soon escalated and by mid-1976, the Papua New Guinea riot police squad was sent to southern Bougainville to restore order. John Momis, at the time Chairman of the putative Republic's ruling council, denounced this action as an invasion.

Mutual concerns about security on the island and the Republic's failure to achieve any international recognition eventually led to talks between the PNG Government and the secessionist leader. A settlement was reached in August 1976 on the basis of increased decentralisation. Bougainville was renamed "North Solomons Province", in recognition of its geography, and re-absorbed politically into PNG with increased self-governance powers, a model later replicated to delineate provincial powers throughout PNG.

Reaction
Papua New Guinea's Chief Minister, Mr Michael Somare, initially showed no outward concern at Bougainville's stand. The Roman Catholic Church, the most powerful organization in Bougainville, officially announced its support for the breakaway move. (Bougainvilleans have experienced German, British, and Australian colonial administrations and missionaries.) Papua New Guinea, Australia and the United Nations did not recognize the secession and PNG government officials on the island simply ignored it. Through their district council, the Western Islands District of the British Solomon Islands Protectorate—comprising a third of the population of the Solomon Islands—asked to join independent Bougainville.

Context
Many Bougainville islanders have always regarded themselves as a separate entity in Papua New Guinea. The people have very dark skin in contrast to the lighter skin colour of Papuans. The island is over 900 kilometres east of the mainland and, geographically, is nearer the Solomon Islands, forming part of the Solomon Islands archipelago.

The declaration of independence followed the discovery sometime previously of the world's largest deposits of copper in the region. The Papua New Guinea Government had then established the Bougainville Copper mine company in Panguna, central Bougainville. Bougainville Copper was a subsidiary of Conzinc Rio Tinto of Australia, which in turn was controlled by the British company Rio Tinto Group. When the mining started, the Australian administration, backed by armed police, gave access to prospectors while informing residents that their land was being taken over without discussion.

References

Separatism in Papua New Guinea
States and territories established in 1975
1976 disestablishments in Oceania
States and territories established in 1990
1998 disestablishments in Oceania
Autonomous Region of Bougainville
Island countries
Former unrecognized countries
Politics of Papua and New Guinea
Decolonization
Former republics